Hoplistocerus gemmatus is a species of beetle in the family Cerambycidae. It was described by Bates in 1874.

References

Anisocerini
Beetles described in 1874